General Wayne Donald Eyre,  (born 1966/1967) is a Canadian Forces officer serving as the chief of the Defence Staff (CDS). Eyre was named acting CDS on February 24, 2021, and appointed to the full position on November 25, 2021. He was also the commander of the Canadian Army and chief of the Army Staff.

Early life
Eyre was born on a farm near Wadena, Saskatchewan, joining the Army Cadets at age 13.  He spent his high school years in Medicine Hat, Alberta. Eyre attended Royal Roads Military College and the Royal Military College.

Military career
Eyre was commissioned into the 2nd Battalion, Princess Patricia's Canadian Light Infantry in 1988. He became commanding officer of the 3rd Battalion, Princess Patricia's Canadian Light Infantry in 2004. He went on to become commander of 2 Canadian Mechanized Brigade Group in 2009 and, after that, Deputy Commanding General of Operations for the United States Army's XVIII Airborne Corps in 2012, in which role he was deployed to Afghanistan. He was appointed General Officer Commanding 3rd Canadian Division and Joint Task Force West in 2014.

In May 2018, Eyre became the first non-American to serve as deputy commander of the United Nations Command in South Korea. He was succeeded by Vice Admiral Stuart Mayer of the Royal Australian Navy in June 2019, and returned to Canada as Commander Military Personnel Command.

On July 12, 2019, it was announced Eyre would be appointed the commander of the Canadian Army, effective from August 20.

Eyre was appointed acting chief of the Defence Staff on February 24, 2021, following the stepping aside of Admiral Art McDonald pending an investigation by the Canadian Forces National Investigation Service. He was promoted to full general on August 13, 2021 and appointed as the official Chief of Defence Staff on November 25, 2021.

Eyre was made a Commander of the United States' Legion of Merit on April 24, 2021. He had previously been appointed as an officer of the American order while a brigadier-general in 2015 and, in 2020, was awarded an Oak Leaf Cluster (second award) to the Legion of Merit.

On March 15, 2022, Eyre, along with 313 other Canadians, was banned from entering Russia, in protest of the Government of Canada's opposition to the Russian invasion of Ukraine.

References

|-

|-

Canadian generals
Canadian military personnel of the War in Afghanistan (2001–2021)
Foreign recipients of the Legion of Merit
Living people
Recipients of the Meritorious Service Decoration
Commanders of the Canadian Army
Princess Patricia's Canadian Light Infantry officers
1960s births